Lesbian, gay, bisexual, and transgender (LGBT) people in Espírito Santo, Brazil enjoy many of the same legal protections available to non-LGBT people. Homosexuality is legal in the state.

Same-sex unions
On 15 August 2012, the "Corregedoria Geral da Justiça" of the State of Espírito Santo issued a Circular Letter stating that all Civil Regestries of that State should address same-sex marriage the same way they would do it regarding that for opposite-sex couples, making it the third Brazilian State to deal with this subject in its State jurisdiction.

References

Espirito Santo
Espírito Santo